The denial of Kurds was the official state policy of Turkey for several decades, which denied that Kurds constitute an own ethnic group and alleged that they instead are a subgroup of Turks and the words 'Kurd' and 'Kurdistan' were omitted by state institutions.

1920s–1960s 

The euphemism "Mountain Turks" for the Kurds was invented by General  and initially used to describe a people living in the mountains who did not speak their own language but a Turkish dialect. Tevfik Rüştü Aras, the Turkish foreign minister between 1925 and 1938, defended the idea that the Kurds should disappear like the Indians in the United States. Kâzım Karabekir, a former commander of the Turkish Army during the War of Independence, said the Kurds in Dersim were in fact assimilated Turks and they should be reminded of their Turkishness. The Turkish Minister of Justice Mahmut Esat Bozkurt, stated that there is no other nation which could claim rights in Turkey than the Turkish race, and that all non-Turks would only have the right to be a servant or slave.   
Subsequently, the simple mention of the words Kurds and Kurdistan was prohibited, and replaced with terms like "Mountain Turks" and "The East", respectively. The prohibition also included text in foreign languages. That there has ever existed a Kurdish nation was denied, according to the Turkish History Thesis the Kurds migrated from Turanic Central Asia in the past. During the 1920s and 1930s, merchants were fined for every word of Kurdish they used separately. In school, students were punished if they were caught speaking Kurdish and during the 1960s Turkish language boarding schools were established in order to separate the students from their Kurdish relatives and Turkify the Kurdish population.

1960s–1980s 
The term "Mountain Turk" became more commonly used in 1961. The Turkish president Cemal Gürsel denied the existence of Kurds in Turkey in a press conference in London and also during a speech he held in Diyarbakir. To the book History of Varto and the Eastern Provinces  by Mehmet Şerif Fırat Gürsel wrote a foreword, in which he credited Fırat for providing scientific evidence for the Turkishness of the Kurds and demanded scientific studies to leave no doubt that Kurds were in reality "Mountain Turks". The book was made available to University Professors, students and journalists for free and also included into libraries of educational institutions. 

Cemal Gürsel was also closely linked to the then newly established Turkish Cultural Research Institute (TKAE) which published several books on the topic. Besides, Gürsel encouraged the use of the phrase "Spit in the face of him who calls you a Kurd".  During the trials against the Revolutionary Cultural Eastern Hearths (DDKO) following the coup d'état in 1971, the prosecution argued that Kurds do not actually exist, and their language was in reality a dialect of Turkish. Also Kenan Evren, the chief of the military junta following the coup d'état in 1980, denied the existence of a Kurdish ethnicity and claimed the word Kurd arose from the sound the snow made if one walked in it and restricted the use of the Kurdish language. The term "Mountain Turk" was officially replaced with the new euphemism "Eastern Turk" in 1980. As during the 1980s the Kurdistan Workers' Party appeared, their members were accused of trying to compel the eastern Turks, that they are Kurds.

21st century

Censorship in academia 
A 2020 report by the İsmail Beşikçi Foundation on the censorship that exists in Kurdish studies in Turkey found that both censorship and self-censorship are frequent when writing about Kurds and their history, geography, culture and language for fear of being penalized. Words like including "Kurdistan", "colony" and "anti-colonial" also remain a taboo in writing about Kurds.

State censorship 
In March 2021 the Turkish Ministry of National Education released a school book on the Kurdish majority Diyarbakir Province which makes no mention of Kurds or Kurdish language at all. It also claims that the language spoken in the city Diyarbakır is similar to the Turkish dialect spoken in Baku, Azerbaijan. In August 2021, authorities changed the name of a 17th century mosque in Kilis from "Kurds' mosque" to "Turks' mosque" prompting criticism from the Kurdish community.

On the discourse of Erdoğan in regards to Kurds, Mucahit Bilici writes that:

See also
Anti-Kurdish sentiment
Conspiracy theories in Turkey
Genetic studies on Turkish people
Human rights of Kurdish people in Turkey
Kurdish–Turkish conflict (1978–present)
Origin of the Kurds
Pseudo-Turkology

References 

Turkish nationalism
Racism in Turkey
Kurds in Turkey
Anti-Kurdish sentiment
Denialism
Historical negationism
Far-right politics in Turkey
Kemalism
Historiography of Turkey
Cultural genocide
Pseudoarchaeology
Pseudolinguistics
Pseudohistory
Linguistic controversies
Textbook controversies
Academic controversies
Turkology
Kurdish studies
Education controversies in Turkey